A glacial boundary is a line on a map representing the farthest advance of a glacier that has retreated.  It generally refers to the extent of continental, rather than alpine, glaciers.

In the northern hemisphere, glaciers advanced from the north during the Pleistocene epoch.  The glacial boundary thus represents the farthest southern extent of the glaciers at that time.

In North America, the boundary from the most recent ice sheet passes through the states of New York, New Jersey, Pennsylvania, Ohio, Kentucky, Indiana, Illinois, Missouri, Kansas, Nebraska, South Dakota, Montana, and Washington.  It also crosses the Canada–US border in several locations.

See Timeline of glaciation.

See the U.S. National Atlas for a map of the boundary in North America.

Cartography

Glaciology